Nampalari is a rural commune in the Cercle of Niono in the Ségou Region of Mali. The commune has an area of 5,111 square kilometers and contains 22 villages. In the 2009 census it had a population of 11,052. The chef-lieu is the village of Nampala.

References

External links
.
.

Communes of Ségou Region